Shellfish poisoning includes four syndromes that share some common features and are primarily associated with bivalve molluscs (such as mussels, clams, oysters and scallops.)  As filter feeders, these shellfish may accumulate toxins produced by microscopic algae, such as cyanobacteria, diatoms and dinoflagellates.

Syndromes
The syndromes are:
 Amnesic shellfish poisoning (ASP)
 Diarrheal shellfish poisoning (DSP)
 Neurotoxic shellfish poisoning (NSP)
 Paralytic shellfish poisoning (PSP)

See also 
 Cyanotoxin
 Gonyaulax

References

External links 

 Human Illness Associated with Harmful Algae

Seafood
Toxic effect of noxious substances eaten as food